Mechanicsville is an unincorporated community in Rockbridge County, Virginia, United States.

References

Unincorporated communities in Rockbridge County, Virginia
Unincorporated communities in Virginia